Martin Šagát (born November 11, 1984) is a Slovak professional ice hockey player currently playing for Herning Blue Fox in the Danish Metal Ligaen. He was drafted 91st overall by the Toronto Maple Leafs in the 2003 NHL Entry Draft.

Sagat played briefly with Dukla Trencin of the Slovak Extraliga, in 2002–03 before being drafted by the Toronto Maple Leafs in the 2003 NHL Entry Draft. To be closer to the Maple Leafs, Sagat joined the Kootenay Ice of the Western Hockey League for two years. Sagat then spent to years with Toronto's American Hockey League affiliate, the Toronto Marlies. After only 5 games in the ECHL with the Elmira Jackals in the 2007, Sagat left to continue his career in the Czech Republic, playing for various teams in the Czech Extraliga and the 1st Czech Republic Hockey League.

In August 2015, Sagat left the Czech Republic to join the Herning Blue Fox of the Danish Metal Ligaen.

Career statistics

Regular season and playoffs

International

References

External links

1984 births
Living people
BK Mladá Boleslav players
HK Dukla Trenčín players
Kootenay Ice players
HC Dynamo Pardubice players
Slovak ice hockey left wingers
HC Slovan Ústečtí Lvi players
Toronto Maple Leafs draft picks
Toronto Marlies players
People from Prievidza
Sportspeople from the Trenčín Region
Slovak expatriate ice hockey players in Canada
Slovak expatriate ice hockey players in the United States
Slovak expatriate ice hockey players in the Czech Republic
Slovak expatriate sportspeople in Denmark
Expatriate ice hockey players in Denmark